Lia Schilhuber is a retired East German-Austrian slalom canoeist who competed in the 1960s. She won four medals at the ICF Canoe Slalom World Championships, with two golds (Folding K-1 team: 1963 Spittal, K-1 team: 1965) and two silvers (K-1: 1965, 1967).

References

East German female canoeists
Austrian female canoeists
Possibly living people
Year of birth missing (living people)
Medalists at the ICF Canoe Slalom World Championships